Tony Jian (born 18 August 1955) is a Taiwanese physician and politician.

Education
Jian earned his medical degree at Chung Shan Medical University, and obtained a master's degree in international politics at National Chung Hsing University after beginning studies in a related field at the Department of Public Administration of Tunghai University.

Career
Prior to his involvement in politics, Jian was a physician specializing in thoracic medicine. He was mayor of Dali, Taichung from 1998 to 2002, when he first won election to the Legislative Yuan. During his first term, Jian was named to the legislature's Health, Environment and Social Welfare Committee. He opposed a plan to reduce Public Welfare Lottery drawings because people with disabilities who sold tickets would earn less money. Jian has worked to improve Taiwan's international space, and was critical of the World Health Assembly and World Trade Organization, which barred Taiwanese participation due to political pressure from China. Jian sought to limit immigration from China to Taiwan, and proposed that naturalized citizens of Chinese origin be barred from voting in elections for seven years after acquiring Republic of China citizenship. Jian believed that financial statements of medical institutions should remain private information, a stance ridiculed by the Taiwan Health Reform Foundation.

Jian was a candidate in both the 2004 and 2008 legislative elections, but lost both times. He challenged the 2008 result in court, and Jian's Kuomintang opponent Chiang Lien-fu was indicted on 29 January 2008. On 27 February, Chiang's win was annulled. A by election was held on 9 January 2010, which Jian won, defeating Yu Wen-chin. Jian resigned from the legislature on 13 September 2011, after causing a fatal traffic collision. Ho Hsin-chun was named the DPP candidate for Jian's constituency, and succeeded him in office. Following his resignation, Jian resumed his medical career.

References

1955 births
Living people
Members of the 5th Legislative Yuan
Members of the 7th Legislative Yuan
Taichung Members of the Legislative Yuan
Democratic Progressive Party Members of the Legislative Yuan
Mayors of places in Taiwan
Tunghai University alumni
National Chung Hsing University alumni
Taiwanese thoracic surgeons